Chris Minh Doky (born 7 February 1969) is a Vietnamese-Danish jazz bassist. He is the younger brother of jazz pianist Niels Lan Doky. He released his first album, Appreciation, in 1989 four years after picking up the instrument.

As a sideman, he has collaborated with Mike Stern, Michael Brecker, Trilok Gurtu, Ryuichi Sakamoto, and David Sanborn.

His sound is often described as a blend of his native Scandinavian tradition with the feel of his adopted homeland, the United States. His wife Tanja is a lady-in-waiting to Denmark's Crown Princess Mary.

Discography
 Appreciation (Storyville, 1989)
 The Sequel (Storyville, 1990)
 Letters (Storyville, 1991)
 The Toronto Concert (Maracatu, 1992) with Niels Lan Doky, John Abercrombie, Adam Nussbaum
 Paris by Night (Soul Note, 1993)
 Live in Marciac (Dreyfus, 1994)
 Blue Eyes (Dreyfus, 1998)
 Minh (EMI, 1998)
 Listen Up! (Virgin, 2000)
 Cinematique (Blue Note/Capitol, 2002)
 The Nomad Diaries (Blue Note, 2006)
 Scenes from a Dream (Red Dot, 2010)
 New Nordic Jazz (Red Dot, 2015)
 Transparency (Red Dot, 2018)

References

External links
 Official website

1969 births
Danish jazz double-bassists
Male double-bassists
Danish people of Vietnamese descent
Living people
DR Big Band members
21st-century double-bassists
21st-century Danish male musicians
Male jazz musicians
20th-century double-bassists
20th-century Danish male musicians
21st-century Danish musicians
20th-century Danish musicians